From Paris with Love is a 2010 English-language French action thriller film directed by Pierre Morel and starring John Travolta and Jonathan Rhys Meyers. The screenplay was co-written by Luc Besson. The film was released in the United States on February 5, 2010 by Lionsgate Films and internationally by Warner Bros. Pictures.

Plot 
James Reese, a personal aide to the U.S. ambassador in France, lives comfortably in Paris with his girlfriend Caroline, but his real passion is his side job as a low-level operative for the CIA. Due to a shortage of operatives in France, he is eventually partnered with field agent Charlie Wax. However, Reese finds Wax detained by French Customs as Wax refuses to surrender cans of his favorite energy drink. Despite the apparent triviality of the situation, Wax continues to verbally abuse French Customs until Reese uses his diplomatic authority to allow Wax's luggage through customs.

Once in the car, Wax apologizes for his behavior and reveals that the cans actually held pieces of his personal sidearm. Wax then explains that he has been sent to Paris to investigate a Triad drug ring indirectly responsible for the death of the niece of the Secretary of Defense. During the investigation, Wax raids a Triad run restaurant and warehouse where he reveals that his true objective is to trace money back to a circle of Pakistani terrorists. Evidence leads them to the terrorist hideout in a rundown apartment, resulting in an armed confrontation wherein most of the terrorists are killed. There, Wax and Reese learn that the terrorists plan to infiltrate the U.S. embassy with explosives hidden beneath their burkas. As they collect evidence, they find photographs of Reese pinned to a wall.

Ultimately, Reese learns that the terrorists are targeting a summit meeting. During dinner, Wax realizes that Reese's fiancée Caroline is a sleeper agent who was assigned to infiltrate them. When confronted, Caroline shoots Reese in the shoulder and escapes through a window, before a car picks her up on the street below. Caroline plans to detonate an explosive vest at the summit while the other remaining terrorist speeds towards a US motorcade in an attempted suicide attack, although Wax destroys the vehicle with a rocket launcher just in time. Reese then finds Caroline at the summit and attempts to dissuade her from carrying out her mission, but she attempts to detonate her vest anyway and Reese is ultimately forced to kill her. As the U.S. official from the motorcade arrives at the summit, she berates Reese for inconveniencing her, and Wax reminds Reese of the often ungrateful and ignorant people they protect.

As Wax leaves Paris, Reese escorts him to his plane, where Wax offers a full-time partnership. The two play a game of chess on the tarmac, placing their handguns on a utility cart, Reese revealing that he is now carrying a Desert Eagle pistol, and Wax welcomes him to the club as his partner.

Cast 

 John Travolta as Charlie Wax
 Jonathan Rhys Meyers as James Reese
 Kasia Smutniak as Caroline
 David Gasman as German Tourist/The Voice
 Richard Durden as Ambassador Bennington
 Yin Bing as M. Wong
 Amber Rose Revah as Nichole
 Eric Godon as Foreign Minister
 Francois Bredon as The Thug
 Chems Dahmani as Rashid (As Chems Eddine Dahmani)
  as The Pimp
 Julien Hagnery as Chinese Punk
 Mostefa Stiti as Dir Yasin
 Rebecca Dayan as Foreign Minister's Aide
  as Airport Security Official
 Didier Constant as Customs Official
 Alexandra Boyd as Head of the Delegation
 Stephen Shagov as Embassy Security
 Mike Powers as Embassy Security
 Nick Loren as Chief of Security
 Farid Elouardi as Bearded Driver
 Melissa Mars as Wax's Hooker
  as Asian Hooker 'German'
 Frederic Chau as Chinese Maitre D
 Tam Solo as Suicidal Pakistani
 John Kiriakou as Himself (uncredited)
 Luc Besson as Man getting out of car (uncredited)
 Kelly Preston as Woman on Eiffel tower (uncredited)

Reception 
The film has received mixed reviews from critics. On the review aggregator Rotten Tomatoes, the film holds a rating of 37% with an average score of 4.80/10. The site’s critical consensus states, "Though not without its charms—chief among them John Travolta's endearingly over-the-top performance—From Paris with Love is too muddled and disjointed to satisfy." Peter Travers of Rolling Stone gave it one star out of four, stating, "From Paris With Love has no vital signs at all, just crushing dull repetition that makes one noisy, violent scene play exactly like the last one." A couple of reviews from SBS and Newshub criticised the film for "ludicrous" plot developments and racism.

Box office 
The film opened in the US on February 5, 2010 and took $8,158,860 on its opening weekend, ranked number 3 in the charts in 2,722 theaters. The movie was open in the US until March 11, 2010, a total of 5 weeks. Its final US domestic gross was $24,077,427. It also took just over $28m internationally for a worldwide total of $52,365,407- just grossing back its $52m budget. In July 2010 Parade Magazine listed the film as number 4 on its list of "Biggest Box Office Flops of 2010 (So Far)."

DVD 
The movie was released on DVD in the US on June 8, 2010 and sold 624,791 units for a gross of $11,085,323. It was the third biggest selling DVD in its opening week, behind Alice in Wonderland and Shutter Island, with 293,011 units sold. The movie was released on DVD and Blu-ray in the UK on August 2, 2010.

Potential sequel 
In an interview with Celebrity Examiner, Luc Besson commented that he would love to see From Paris With Love turn into a franchise with sequels.

Travolta said in an interview with The Star Ledger: "We could do, ‘From London With Love,’ ‘From Prague With Love.’ This is one of the only movies that I would enjoy as a franchise. I’m not a big sequel person, but this one I would love."

As of April 2022, there has been no further information on the proposed sequel.

References

External links 

 
 
 
 
 

2010 films
2010 action thriller films
American action thriller films
French action thriller films
D-Box motion-enhanced films
Films about organized crime in France
Films about terrorism in Europe
Films directed by Pierre Morel
Films produced by Luc Besson
Films set in Paris
Films shot in Paris
Lionsgate films
Triad films
Works about Pakistan
EuropaCorp films
English-language French films
Films scored by David Buckley
2010s English-language films
2010s American films
2010s French films
2010s Hong Kong films